Harionago, also known as Harionna, is a "frightening female ghoul" in Japanese mythology. Her name literally meaning "Barbed woman" the Harionago is said to be a "beautiful woman with extremely long hair tipped with thorn-like barbs," Her hair is under her "direct control, and she uses it to ensnare men." She is said to wander the roads of the Japanese prefecture of Ehime on the island of Shikoku. When she finds a "young man, she will smile at him, and if the young man dares to smile back, Harionago will drop her terrible, barbed hair and attack."

References

Yōkai
Female legendary creatures